Tatyana Petrovna Providokhina (born 26 March 1953 in Leningrad) is a former Soviet athlete, who mainly competed in the 800 metres.

She competed for the USSR in the 1980 Summer Olympics held in Moscow, where she won the bronze medal in the women's 800 metres event. She also won the gold medal in the 800 metres at the 1978 European Championships in Athletics.

References
 

1953 births
Soviet female middle-distance runners
Olympic bronze medalists for the Soviet Union
Athletes (track and field) at the 1980 Summer Olympics
Olympic athletes of the Soviet Union
Living people
Athletes from Saint Petersburg
European Athletics Championships medalists
Medalists at the 1980 Summer Olympics
Olympic bronze medalists in athletics (track and field)